Massimiliano Capuzzoni (Milan, 17 April 1969 - Taormina, 5 August 1995) was an Italian rugby union player. He played as a flanker.

Capuzzoni played for A. S. Rugby Milano, where he started his career in 1981/82, at 12 years old, in the first categories. He joined the first team in 1987/88, aged 18 years old, and would remain in Rugby Milano until 1990/91. He moved to Rugby Lyons Piacenza for the two following seasons, 1991/92 to 1992/93. Capuzzoni returned to Milan, this time to play for Amatori Rugby Milano, from 1993/94 to 1994/95. He won the Italian Championship and the Cup of Italy in 1994/95, in what would be the last season of his career.

He had 2 caps for Italy, from 1993 to 1995, without scoring. He was called for the 1995 Rugby World Cup but never left the bench.

Capuzzoni was still a promising player when he died in the sequence of a diving accident in Taormina, Sicily, on 5 August 1995, aged only 26 years old. He was paid tribute five days later at the Mario Giuriati Stadium, of Rugby Milano, his first team, in a ceremony attended by fans of his three teams.

In a tribute to Capuzzoni, the Capuzzoni Memorial takes place every year since 1996, as a tournament held in Milan or Piacenza, between the three teams where he played.

References

External links

1969 births
1995 deaths
Italian rugby union players
Italy international rugby union players
Amatori Rugby Milano players
Rugby union flankers
Sportspeople from Milan